Togo competed at the 2016 Summer Olympics in Rio de Janeiro, Brazil, from 5 to 21 August 2016.  This was the nation's tenth appearance at the Summer Olympics.

The Togo National Olympic Committee sent a team of five athletes, two men and three women, to compete only in athletics, swimming, and rowing at the Games. All of them made their Olympic debut in Rio de Janeiro, except for freestyle swimmer Adzo Kpossi, who established history for Togo by becoming the youngest athlete of the Games four years earlier. The lone returning Olympian from London 2012, Kpossi led the delegation as Togo's flag bearer in the opening ceremony.

Togo, however, left Rio de Janeiro without a single medal for the second consecutive time, failing to reproduce it from the 2008 Summer Olympics in Beijing, where slalom kayaker Benjamin Boukpeti bagged the bronze.

Athletics

Togo has received universality slots from IAAF to send two athletes (one male and one female) to the Olympics.

Track & road events

Rowing

Togo has received an invitation from the Tripartite Commission to send a rower in the women's single sculls to the Rio regatta, signifying the nation's Olympic debut in the sport.

Qualification Legend: FA=Final A (medal); FB=Final B (non-medal); FC=Final C (non-medal); FD=Final D (non-medal); FE=Final E (non-medal); FF=Final F (non-medal); SA/B=Semifinals A/B; SC/D=Semifinals C/D; SE/F=Semifinals E/F; QF=Quarterfinals; R=Repechage

Swimming

Togo has received a Universality invitation from FINA to send two swimmers (one male and one female) to the Olympics.

References

External links 
 

Nations at the 2016 Summer Olympics
2016
Olympics